Doug Overbey (born December 11, 1954) is an American lawyer and former politician who served as the United States Attorney for the Eastern District of Tennessee from 2017 to 2021. Prior to becoming the U.S. Attorney, he represented District 2 in the Tennessee Senate as a Republican from 2009 to 2017. Overbey was chairman of the Senate Ethics Committee and vice-chairman of the Senate Judiciary Committee and the Senate Finance Committee. He is a senior partner and co-founder of the Robertson Overbey law firm and has served as an adjunct faculty member at the University of Tennessee College of Law. Prior to becoming a state senator, Overbey served in the Tennessee House of Representatives from 2000 to 2008. On February 8, 2021, he along with 55 other Trump-era attorneys were asked to resign.

Education and career
Overbey graduated magna cum laude from Carson-Newman College in 1976 with a Bachelor of Arts degree and first in his class from the University of Tennessee College of Law, in 1979, where he was named to the Order of the Coif and the Phi Delta Phi, Roosevelt Inn, Graduate of the Year. Overbey is a co-founder of the law firm of Robertson, Overbey, Wilson & Beeler. He is a member of the American, Tennessee, Knoxville and Blount County Bar Associations, has served as a member of the House of Delegates of the Tennessee Bar Association, and has been a presenter at many CLE seminars, including annual legislative updates for the Knoxville and Blount County Bar Associations.

Community involvement
He has been active in the Blount County community, having served two terms on the Blount County Commission, and as President of Maryville Kiwanis, President of the United Way of Blount County, Chairman of the Maryville-Alcoa College Community Orchestra, Chairman of the Johnson Girls Group Home, and board member of the Blount County Chamber of Commerce and Knoxville Museum of Art. He has also served on the Maryville College Board of Church Visitors and on the board of Success by Six. He is a graduate of the 2004 Class of Leadership Blount.

He currently serves on the Boards of New Hope – Blount County Children's Advocacy Center, A Secret Safe Place for Newborns of Tennessee, Presbyterian Homes of Tennessee, and SunTrust Bank of East Tennessee, and is an Advisory Member of the Board of Directors of the Great Smoky Mountain Council, Boy Scouts of America. He was recently named as a member of the Board of the East Tennessee Development District. He is a member of the Sevier County Ruritan Club and a member of the Class of 2009 of Leadership Sevier. Sen. Overbey also holds the rank of captain in the Tennessee Civil Air Patrol.

He is an active member of St. Andrew's Episcopal Church and served ten years as Chancellor of the Episcopal Diocese of East Tennessee. He is the only lay person to serve as President of the Standing Committee of the Diocese of East Tennessee.

Politics
On January 13, 2009, Overbey was sworn in as Tennessee State Senator for the Eighth District, representing Blount and Sevier Counties. As a member of the 106th Tennessee General Assembly, he has been appointed to serve on the Finance, Ways & Means Committee, Secretary of the Judiciary Committee, and a member of the Health & General Welfare Committee.

Overbey previously represented the 20th House district in the 102nd, 103rd, 104th, and 105th General Assemblies, where he served on the Finance, Ways & Means Committee, Health & Human Resources Committee, Calendar & Rules Committee, Select Committee on Ethics, and Joint Select Committee on Children and Youth. He was Chairman of the House Health Care Facilities Subcommittee for six years and a member of the Budget Subcommittee for four years. He also served as Secretary of the Special Joint Committee to Study the Development and Implementation of a Long-Term Care Services Plan and on the Tennessee Court Information System Steering Committee.

References

External links
 Biography at U.S. Department of Justice
 Biography at Ballotpedia

1954 births
Living people
Republican Party Tennessee state senators
Carson–Newman University alumni
University of Tennessee College of Law alumni
Maryville College
21st-century American politicians
United States Attorneys for the Eastern District of Tennessee